WNYR-FM (98.5 MHz) is an adult contemporary music formatted radio station in Waterloo/Geneva, New York. Along with the music, though they also provide Finger Lakes News and events information both through their website and on through the radio. They broadcast throughout the Finger Lakes.

Programming
Weekday Morning Show is Jim and Mary in the Morning.  Broadcasting Monday - Friday from 5:30-9am. Jim Schreck became cohost and Program Director of WNYR in June 2009.

Weekday afternoons from Noon to 5 is Sorah Devlin.

Saturday mornings from 6 am to 10 am is The Weekend Wakeup with Sorah & Yvonne.

They also air John Tesh in the evenings and on weekends. In addition, they air American Top 40: The 80's every Saturday evening from 6pm-10pm.

Previous logos

External links
WNYR official website
OnTheRadio.Net Info for WNYR FM

NYR-FM
Mainstream adult contemporary radio stations in the United States
Radio stations established in 1975